Chaleur (French for "warmth") may refer to:

 Chaleur Bay, or Baie des Chaleurs in Canada between Quebec and New Brunswick
 Montreal – Gaspé train, formerly the Chaleur.
 Fireship of Baie des Chaleurs, an apparition reported on Chaleur Bay
 , a name given to several Canadian ships